Unlocked is Christian rapper Verbs' third album.

Track listing

 Live to the Music
 She's Miss Sin (tKimmey)
 Trippin' (featuring FAILURE)
 Love Triangle
 Pre-Paid (featuring Grits and Nirva Dorsaint)
 What You Rock Now
 Feelin' the Interlude
 My Neighborhood (featuring Grits)
 Run with It
 Can You Hear Me? (featuring MOC & Shonlock)
 Lebron JAMES
 John Cena

Verbs (rapper) albums
2003 albums